The Lonewolf Nunataks are a group of isolated nunataks lying  northwest of the Wilhoite Nunataks, at the south side of Byrd Névé, Antarctica. They were so named by the New Zealand Geological Survey Antarctic Expedition (1960–61) because of their isolation.

References

Nunataks of George V Land